The following is a list of the television networks and announcers that have broadcast the WNBA Finals.

2020s

2010s

2000s

1990s

See also
WNBA on ESPN
WNBA on ABC
NBA on NBC
NBA on ABC
NBA on ESPN

References

External links
Sports Media Watch: WNBA
Episode List: WNBA Finals - TV Tango

Broadcasters
Women's National Basketball Association media
National Basketball Association on television
Basketball on NBC
WNBA
ESPN2
ABC Sports
Lifetime (TV network)
Lists of announcers of American sports events
Lists of Women's National Basketball Association broadcasters